GLA University is a private university in Mathura, Uttar Pradesh. It has been declared fit to receive central assistance under Section 12B of UGC Act, 1956 after proper assessment for the same by the UGC. It is recognized by University Grants Commission (UGC), NCTE  and Pharmacy Council of India. It has been accredited by the National Assessment and Accreditation Council (NAAC) with ‘A+’ Grade.

Institutes
The Institutes under the university are:
Institute of Engineering and Technology
Institute of Applied Science and Humanities
Institute of Business Management
Institute of Pharmaceutical Research
University of Polytechnic
Faculty of Education
Institute of Legal Studies & Research
Physical Education
Institute of Agriculture

References

http://www.barcouncilofindia.org/wp-content/uploads/2010/05/List-of-Law-Colleges-having-approval-by-the-BCI-1.pdf

External links
https://www.gla.ac.in/
https://www.apnnews.com/legrand-signs-mou-with-gla-university-sets-up-centre-of-excellence-in-ups-maintenance/
https://news.careers360.com/ugc-approves-2-universities-manav-rachna-gla-offer-online-programmes-for-november-session

Private engineering colleges in India
Pharmacy colleges in Uttar Pradesh
Private universities in Uttar Pradesh
Education in Mathura
Educational institutions established in 2010
Engineering colleges in Uttar Pradesh
2010 establishments in Uttar Pradesh